The discography of Tina Arena, an Australian singer-songwriter, consists of twelve studio albums, four live albums, four compilations, forty-eight singles and forty-three music videos.

Arena began her career in 1976 at the age of eight, singing live on Australia's variety television show, Young Talent Time. After dropping out of the spotlight for several years, she returned in 1990 where she released her debut album Strong as Steel through EMI, which included the hit single "I Need Your Body". She was not comfortable with the image with which  she was being portrayed so she went to find another record deal.

She found a record deal with the record label Columbia Records. Her second album, Don't Ask, was then created with producer David Tyson. It became her highest-selling album with 2 million copies sold worldwide.

She has sold over 10 million records worldwide to date. In France, she has sold over 2.2 million singles and 1.3 million albums. In Australia, she has sold 1.2 million certified albums and half a million singles.

Albums

Studio albums

Compilation albums

Live albums

Notes
^ French Compilation Chart.
° Australian Music DVD Chart.

Video albums

Singles

As lead artist

Notes
1 "Chains" also charted in the following countries: Canada (#20), Israel (#8), Ireland (#9) and Sweden (#38).
2 The Italian version is titled "Ti Voglio Qui".
3 "I Want to Spend My Lifetime Loving You" also charted in the following countries: Austria (#38), the Flanders region of Belgium (#34) and the Netherlands (#4).
4 The French version is titled "Symphonie de l'âme".
5 "Never (Past Tense)" also charted on the US Dance chart (#1), and in the Netherlands (#100).

Promotional singles

Other charted songs

Other appearances

Music videos

References 

Pop music discographies
Rock music discographies
Discographies of Australian artists
Contemporary R&B discographies